The Detroit Masonic Temple is the world's largest Masonic Temple. Located in the Cass Corridor of Detroit, Michigan, at 500 Temple Street, the building serves as a home to various masonic organizations including the York Rite Sovereign College of North America. The building contains a variety of public spaces including three theaters, three ballrooms and banquet halls, and a  clear-span drill hall.

Recreational facilities include a swimming pool, handball court, gymnasium, bowling alley, and a pool hall. It is currently the home of the Detroit Handball Club. The building includes numerous lodge rooms, offices, and dining spaces, as well as a hotel section. Although the hotel rooms are available to any noble of the mystic shrine or blue lodge mason, none are currently in usable condition. Architect George D. Mason designed the whole structure as well as the Masonic Temple Theatre, a venue for concerts, Broadway shows, and other special events in the Detroit Theater District. It contains a  stage, one of the largest in the country.

The Detroit Masonic Temple was designed in the neo-gothic architectural style, using a great deal of limestone. It dominates the skyline in an area known as Cass Corridor, across Temple Street from Cass Park, and Cass Technical High School. It is within walking distance of the Little Caesars Arena and the MotorCity Casino Hotel.

History

The Masonic Temple Association was incorporated in Detroit in 1894. It moved into its first temple, on Lafayette Boulevard at First Street, in 1896. Outgrowing these quarters, the Association purchased land on Bagg Street (now Temple Avenue) to build a new temple that would also include a public theater. Fund-raising for construction of the building raised $2.5 million (equivalent to $ million in ), and ground-breaking took place on Thanksgiving Day, 1920. The cornerstone was placed on September 19, 1922, using the same trowel that George Washington had used to set the cornerstone of the United States Capitol in Washington D.C. The building was dedicated on Thanksgiving Day, 1926.

The horseshoe-shaped auditorium originally had a capacity of 5,000. Due to poor sight lines along the sides of the stage, nearly 600 seats were removed (or never used), reducing maximum seating to 4,404.

It was listed on the National Register of Historic Places in 1980, and is part of the Cass Park Historic District, which was established in 2005.

In April 2013, the building was reported to be in foreclosure over $152,000 in back taxes owed to Wayne County. The debt was paid off in May 2013, and in June 2013, it was revealed that $142,000 of the bill was footed by singer-songwriter Jack White, a Detroit native known for his work with The White Stripes. He wanted to help the temple in its time of need as they had helped his mother in a time of need: the temple gave her a job as an usher in the theater when she was struggling to find work. In response, the Detroit Masonic Temple Association renamed its Scottish Rite cathedral the Jack White Theater. In April 2022, after performing, White proposed to his partner Olivia Jean at the temple and later married her.

Architecture

The Detroit Masonic Temple has been the largest Masonic Temple in the world since 1939, when the Chicago Masonic Temple was demolished. The stage of the auditorium is the second largest in the United States, having a width between walls of 100 feet (30 m) and a depth from the curtain line of 55 feet (17 m).

The large complex includes a 16-story  ritual building connected to a 10-story wing for the Ancient Arabic Order of the Nobles of the Mystic Shrine, now known as Shriners International, by the 7-story Auditorium Building. In between these areas are a 1,586-seat Scottish Rite Cathedral, and a  drill hall used for trade shows and conventions. The drill hall is also home to Detroit Roller Derby. The drill hall has a floating floor, where the entire floor is laid on felt cushions. This type of construction, also known as a sprung floor, provides 'give' to the floor which tends to relieve the marchers.

The building houses two ballrooms: the Crystal Ballroom; and the Fountain Ballroom, the latter of which measures  and accommodates up to 1,000 people. An unfinished theatre located in the top floor of the tower would have seated about 700.

Seven "Craft Lodge Rooms" all have different decorative treatments, the motifs of decoration being taken from the Egyptian, Doric, Ionic, Corinthian, Italian Renaissance, Byzantine, Gothic, and Romanesque styles. All of the artwork throughout the building, especially the decorated ceilings, was done under the direction of Italian artists. The building includes Royal Arch room, as well as a Commandery Asylum for the Knights Templar.

The Scottish Rite Cathedral has a seating capacity of 1600. Its stage is 64-feet (19.5 m) wide from wall to wall, with a depth of 37 feet (11 m) from the foot lights.

Architect George D. Mason designed the theatre, which contains a 55-foot-by-100-foot (17 x 30 m) stage. Detroit Masonic Temple was designed in the neo-gothic architectural style, and is faced with Indiana limestone. Although few Masonic buildings are in the Gothic style, the architect believed that Gothic best exemplified Masonic traditions.

Much of the stone, plaster, and metal work in the interior of the building was designed and executed by architectural sculptor Corrado Parducci. The three figures over the main entrance were by Leo Friedlander, while the rest of the considerable architectural sculpture on the exterior was by Bill Gehrke.

Gallery

References

Bibliography

External links

 Building website
Detroit Lodge No. 2 F&AM – Detroit Masonic Temple Archive

Site to view panoramic pictures of this spectacular building (Look down page for thumb of building)

Masonic buildings completed in 1922
Masonic buildings in Michigan
Theatres in Detroit
Buildings with sculpture by Corrado Parducci
Convention centers in Michigan
Skyscraper office buildings in Detroit
Music venues in Michigan
Performing arts centers in Michigan
Culture of Detroit
Event venues established in 1922
Michigan State Historic Sites in Wayne County, Michigan
National Register of Historic Places in Detroit
Historic district contributing properties in Michigan
Clubhouses on the National Register of Historic Places in Michigan
Gothic Revival architecture in Michigan
Limestone buildings in the United States
Concert halls in Michigan
1922 establishments in Michigan
Residential skyscrapers in Detroit
Skyscraper hotels in Detroit